Richard John Brennan (born November 26, 1972) is an American retired professional ice hockey defenceman. He played briefly in the NHL with a number of teams including the Colorado Avalanche, San Jose Sharks, New York Rangers, Los Angeles Kings, Nashville Predators, and Boston Bruins.

Playing career
Brennan was chosen in the 3rd round, 46th overall by the Quebec Nordiques in the 1991 NHL Entry Draft out of high school. After being drafted Brennan chose to go to college and played at Boston University for 4 years. In 1992 he played in the World Junior Ice Hockey Championship for the United States. Brennan's most successful collegiate season came during his junior year (1993–1994) when he scored 35 points in 41 games and earned a number of honors including Hockey East First All-Star team honors and NCAA East Second All-American team honors.

After college Brennan joined the Cornwall Aces for the 1995–96 season. Brennan spent the 1996–97 season with the Hershey Bears in addition to making his NHL debut, appearing in 2 games with the Colorado Avalanche. Brennan then signed as a free agent with the San Jose Sharks in 1997. He spent the majority of the 1997–98 season with the Sharks minor league affiliate Kentucky Thoroughblades while also appearing in 11 games with the Sharks before being traded to the New York Rangers and finishing the season with the Hartford Wolf Pack. The 1998–99 season saw Brennan play 47 games with the Wolf Pack in addition to playing in an NHL career high 24 games with the Rangers.

Brennan played the next 2 seasons with the Lowell Lock Monsters. During the 2000–01 season Brennan also managed to play in 2 games with the Los Angeles Kings. In 2001 Brennan signed with the Nashville Predators and spent the majority of the 2001–2002 season in the minors, only appearing in 4 games with the Predators.  The 2002–03 and 2003–04 seasons saw Brennan play with the Providence Bruins. During the 2002–2003 season he played in 7 games with the Boston Bruins.

Brennan began playing in Europe in 2004. He split one year between Swiss team SC Bern of the NLA before transferring to Augsburger Panther of the DEL in Germany. Brennan remained in Germany the following season and played 3 seasons with the Nürnberg Ice Tigers. Brennan then spent the 2008–09 season in the Austrian Hockey League with HC TWK Innsbruck before retiring.

Career statistics

Regular season and playoffs

International

Awards and honors

References

External links
 

1972 births
Augsburger Panther players
Boston Bruins players
Boston University Terriers men's ice hockey players
Brantford Smoke players
Colorado Avalanche players
Cornwall Aces players
Hartford Wolf Pack players
HC TWK Innsbruck players
Hershey Bears players
Ice hockey players from New York (state)
Kentucky Thoroughblades players
Living people
Los Angeles Kings players
Lowell Lock Monsters players
Manchester Monarchs (AHL) players
Milwaukee Admirals players
Nashville Predators players
New York Rangers players
Nürnberg Ice Tigers players
Providence Bruins players
Quebec Nordiques draft picks
San Jose Sharks players
SC Bern players
SC Langenthal players
Sinupret Ice Tigers players
Sportspeople from Schenectady, New York
American men's ice hockey defensemen
NCAA men's ice hockey national champions
AHCA Division I men's ice hockey All-Americans